Pay Pack & Follow is an album by American musician John Phillips, released in April 2001 following his death a month earlier. It was recorded in the 1970s for release on The Rolling Stones' record label "Rolling Stones Records" but remained unissued until 2001. Mick Jagger appears on backing vocals and co-production, Keith Richards on guitar and co-production, former Stone Mick Taylor also on guitar and current Stone Ron Wood on bass guitar.

The title is taken from a famous telegram of Sir Richard Francis Burton.

Track listing
All songs written by John Phillips, except where noted.

"Mr Blue" - 3:49
"She's Just 14" - 4:55
"Wilderness of Love" - 3:49
"Oh Virginia" - 4:11
"Sunset Boulevard" - 4:17
"Pussycat" - 6:09
"Zulu Warrior" (Phillips, Mick Jagger) - 3:28
"Very Dread" - 4:37
"2001" - 4:37

Personnel
John Phillips - lead vocals, keyboards
Keith Richards - electric, acoustic (all) and electric slide guitars (2), backing vocals
Mick Taylor - electric and acoustic guitars (4, 7, 8)
Ron Wood - bass guitar (1, 4, 7, 8)
Chris Spedding - electric guitar (1, 4, 5, 6, 8, 9)
Jean Roussel - keyboards
Sid McGinnis - acoustic guitar (2, 3)
Jeb Guthrie - tambourine
Paul Shaffer - keyboards
Yogi Horton - drums
David Wofford - bass guitar (3, 5, 6, 9)
John Regan - bass guitar (2)
John Kito - keyboards, piano
Debra Dobkin - percussion
Rebop Kwaku Baah - percussion
Mick Jagger - backing vocals
Michelle Phillips - backing vocals
Laura MacKenzie Phillips - backing vocals
James Biondillo - string arrangement

References

John Phillips (musician) albums
2001 albums
Albums published posthumously